Dhoomakethu is a 1968 Indian Kannada-language film,  directed by R. N. Jayagopal. The film stars Rajkumar, Udaya Chandrika, Udaykumar and Narasimharaju. The film has musical score by T. G. Lingappa. This is the debut movie of R. N. Jayagopal as a director. V.Ravichandran had revealed that he had made his first on screen appearance in this movie.

Cast

Rajkumar as Kumar
Udaya Chandrika
Udaykumar
Narasimharaju
Ranga
Sampath
Ganapathi Bhat
Bangalore Nagesh
Nagappa
Shakti Prasad
Govindaraj
Sathyappa
Srinivas
Sadhana
Indrani
Girija
Cladet
Betti
Enjaleen
K. S. Ashwath in Guest Appearance
Shylashree in Guest Appearance

Soundtrack
The music was composed by T. G. Lingappa.

References

External links
 

1968 films
1960s Kannada-language films
Films scored by T. G. Lingappa
Films directed by R. N. Jayagopal